Aryna Siarhiejeŭna Sabalenka (born 5 May 1998) is a Belarusian professional tennis player. She has been ranked as high as world No. 2 in singles and world No. 1 in doubles by the Women's Tennis Association (WTA). Sabalenka has won one major singles title, at the 2023 Australian Open, and two major doubles titles, at the 2019 US Open and the 2021 Australian Open, both partnering Elise Mertens. She has won 18 career titles in total, twelve in singles and six in doubles.

Sabalenka was relatively unknown until 2017 when she rose to prominence by leading the Belarus Fed Cup team to a runner-up finish with Aliaksandra Sasnovich, despite both of them being ranked outside the top 75 at the time. Following the 2017 Fed Cup, she began having more success on the WTA Tour, reaching four finals in 2018 and achieving eight top ten victories. Sabalenka continued to excel in singles in 2019 with three titles in China, highlighted by a defence of her Wuhan Open title at the Premier 5 level and by winning the WTA Elite Trophy at the end of the year. She finished both 2018 and 2019 ranked No. 11 in the world in singles. Sabalenka also began playing doubles regularly in 2019. With Mertens as her partner, she completed the Sunshine Double by winning the two Premier Mandatory tournaments in March, the Indian Wells Open and the Miami Open. After the US Open doubles title later in the year, she also qualified for the WTA Finals for the first time.

Sabalenka has a very aggressive style of play, often accumulating high numbers of winners and unforced errors. With her height, she also has a very powerful serve.

Early life and background
Aryna Sabalenka was born on 5 May 1998 in Minsk, the capital of Belarus. Her father Sergey (d. 2019) was a hockey player. Aryna started playing tennis by chance. She said, "One day, my dad was just driving me somewhere in the car, and on the way he saw tennis courts. So he took me to the courts. I really liked it and enjoyed it and that's how it was. That's how it started." She began training at the National Tennis Academy in Minsk when it opened in 2014.

In 2015, the Belarusian Tennis Federation persuaded Sabalenka and her team to focus on playing low-level professional events instead of junior tournaments, even though she was still eligible to compete at the junior level at the time.

Junior career
Sabalenka had a late start on the ITF Junior Circuit, instead competing on the U14 and U16 Tennis Europe tours at a younger age. She did not compete in the main draw of any ITF events until 2013 at the low-level Grade-4 Tallink Cup in Estonia at the age of 15. She ultimately never played in the junior Grand Slam tournaments, or any other high-level Grade-A and Grade-1 events. Without the higher point levels from these bigger tournaments, she had a career-high ranking of just  225.

Sabalenka won her first ITF title in doubles at the lowest-level Grade-5 Alatan Tour Cup in Belarus in late 2013 with compatriot Vera Lapko as her partner. In 2014, she excelled at Grade 4 events. She reached her first singles final at the Estonian Junior Open in June and won her first singles title at the MTV Total Junior Cup in Finland in October. At the end of the season, Sabalenka defended her Alatan Tour Cup doubles title, this time with compatriot Nika Shytkouskaya, and also won the singles title. She only played in one tournament in 2015, the European Junior Championships. As a Grade B1 event, this was the highest level junior tournament she played in. She lost in the second round to top seed Markéta Vondroušová.

Professional career

2012–2016: Top 200, Fed Cup debut
Sabalenka began playing on the ITF Women's Circuit in 2012, even before she competed on the ITF Junior Circuit. Her first five tournaments were in her hometown of Minsk and spread out over two years, but she did not win a main draw match in any of them. She won her first professional match at the very end of 2014 in Istanbul. The following season in October, she won her first two titles in back-to-back weeks in Antalya, both at the $10k level. Sabalenka also won a $25k title the last week of the year. This title put her into the top 300 of the WTA rankings for the first time at the start of 2016. That year, she made her Fed Cup debut in April, losing her only match. She also won her two biggest titles to date at the $50k level. The first in Tianjin put her into the top 200 in May and the second in Toyota in November helped her finish the year ranked at No. 137 in the world.

2017: Fed Cup heroics, WTA 125 title, top 100

Despite some early season success in Fed Cup, Sabalenka had a quiet start to the year otherwise. She played in her first WTA Tour main draw in February as a qualifier at the Dubai Open; however, she did not win her first WTA Tour match until Wimbledon in July. In her Grand Slam debut, she again reached the main draw through qualifying and defeated Irina Khromacheva in the opening round. Sabalenka followed up this achievement with another win over No. 34, Lauren Davis, at the Washington Open, the 2016 runner-up and the highest-ranked player she had defeated at the time.

After losing in qualifying at the US Open, Sabalenka reached her first ever WTA semifinal at the Tashkent Open, defeating third seed and world No. 53, Tatjana Maria, along the way. A few weeks later, she entered the Tianjin Open as the 119th-ranked player in the world, but managed to reach her first WTA tournament final. There, she faced her childhood idol Maria Sharapova, but ultimately lost in two tight sets. With this performance, she rose to No. 76 in the rankings, entering the top 100 for the first time. After losing a tight Fed Cup final to the United States, Sabalenka finished the season by winning the biggest title of her career at the time at the Mumbai Open, a WTA 125 event. The title cemented her at No. 73 at the end of the year.

2018: Newcomer of the Year, Premier 5 title
After playing relatively few WTA events in 2017, Sabalenka utilized her higher ranking to play exclusively on the WTA Tour in 2018. She reached two quarterfinals to begin the year, but lost her opening-round match at the Australian Open to top-ranked Australian and world No. 18 Ashleigh Barty. She then won her first matches at a Premier tournament with a third-round appearance at the Indian Wells Open before the early-year hardcourt season came to a close, including a victory over No. 19, Svetlana Kuznetsova.

Sabalenka began the clay-court season by reaching a second career final at the Ladies Open Lugano, where she finished runner-up to No. 20, Elise Mertens. This success put her in the top 50 for the first time. However, she did not win another match for the rest of the clay-court season, including a first-round defeat to No. 22, Kiki Bertens, at the French Open. Sabalenka had stronger results on grass, playing in tune-ups during each of the three weeks before Wimbledon. She made it to the quarterfinals at the Rosmalen Grass Court Championships and the final at the Premier-level Eastbourne International. At the latter event, she won five consecutive three-set matches, including three over top 20 opponents and her first top-ten victory against defending champion and world No. 7, Karolína Plíšková. Sabalenka lost the final to world No. 2, Caroline Wozniacki. For the third consecutive Grand Slam event, she went out in the first round at Wimbledon.

During the North American hardcourt summer season, Sabalenka continued to rise through the rankings. At the two Premier 5 tournaments, she reached the third round at the Canadian Open and the semifinals at the Cincinnati Open. In the former, she avenged her previous loss to world No. 2, Wozniacki, for the biggest win of her career, hitting 64 winners during the match. In the latter, she recorded two more top ten wins over No. 8 Plíšková and No. 5 Caroline Garcia before losing to world No. 1, Simona Halep. Just a week later, Sabalenka won her first WTA Tour title at the Premier-level Connecticut Open with wins over world No. 9, Julia Görges, in the semifinal, and Carla Suárez Navarro in the final. Playing a fourth consecutive week, she closed out this part of the season with her best result at a Grand Slam tournament to date, making it to the fourth round at the US Open. In particular, she upset world No. 5, Petra Kvitová, in the third round before losing to the eventual champion, Naomi Osaka. She was the only player to win a set against Osaka in the tournament.

After the US Open, Sabalenka earned her first No. 1 seed at the Tournoi de Québec, but lost her opening match. Nonetheless, she followed this up by winning the Premier 5 level Wuhan Open, the biggest title of her career. During the event, she upset No. 6 Elina Svitolina in the second round and did not drop a set in any of her last four matches. The following week, Sabalenka reached the quarterfinals of the China Open, a run that included a win over defending champion and No. 4, Caroline Garcia, for her eighth top-ten victory of the season. This success in China helped her climb to No. 11 in the world. At the end of the season, Sabalenka qualified for the WTA Elite Trophy, where she was grouped with Garcia and Ashleigh Barty. She defeated Barty to open the group, but lost to Garcia in the group's final match. Barty, having defeated Garcia with fewer games lost, advanced out of the group through the tiebreak criteria to end Sabalenka's season. Nonetheless, she was named the WTA Newcomer of the Year for her excellent performance in her first full year on the WTA Tour.

2019: Top 10 debut in singles, world No. 2 in doubles

Singles: Elite Trophy, three titles in China in total
Although Sabalenka once again struggled at the Grand Slam tournaments, she ultimately finished the year with the same year-end ranking as in 2018 on the strength of three titles, all in China. She began the season by winning her third career WTA title at the Shenzhen Open, defeating Alison Riske in the final in a tight three-set match. Due to rain delays in the earlier rounds, she needed to play both the semifinal and the final on the last day of the tournament. However, she could not build on this success in the rest of the first half of the year. Sabalenka lost to 17-year-old Amanda Anisimova in straight sets at both the Australian Open and the French Open in the third and second rounds, respectively. She had been considered the third-leading favourite for the title at the Australian Open. Nonetheless, she made her top-10 debut following the event. Sabalenka fared worse at Wimbledon, losing her opening match to No. 139 Magdaléna Rybáriková. In-between the Grand Slam tournaments, Sabalenka's best result was a semifinal loss to No. 8, Kiki Bertens, at the Premier-level St. Petersburg Trophy in February. She also made the fourth round at the Indian Wells Open. Her best result on clay was a semifinal at the Internationaux de Strasbourg in May.

Sabalenka had a better second half of the season. In her first tournament following Wimbledon, she finished runner-up to Zheng Saisai at the Silicon Valley Classic, a Premier-level event. She did not perform well at either Premier 5 tournament in August or the US Open, losing in the second round at the last Grand Slam tournament of the year. Sabalenka returned to China following the US Open, and produced three strong results in four events. After a quarterfinal at the Zhengzhou Open, she defended her title at the Premier 5 Wuhan Open. During the event, she defeated No. 8 Kiki Bertens in the third round and No. 1 Ashleigh Barty in the semifinals, her first victory over a current world No. 1 player. She won the final over Alison Riske. At the end of the season, Sabalenka qualified for the WTA Elite Trophy for the second consecutive year. She swept her round-robin group of Maria Sakkari and her doubles partner Elise Mertens. In the knockout rounds, Sabalenka defeated Karolína Muchová and Bertens for her fifth career title, and her third title of the year in China.

Doubles: US Open champion, Sunshine Double

Sabalenka started the year ranked No. 73 in doubles. She began partnering with Elise Mertens in January, when the pair lost to top seeds Barbora Krejčíková and Kateřina Siniaková in the third round of the Australian Open. They had their breakthrough in March at the two Premier Mandatory tournaments. In only their second tournament together, Sabalenka and Mertens won the Indian Wells Open. They defeated three of the top five seeds in the event, including second seeds Tímea Babos and Kristina Mladenovic in the first round and top seeds Krejčíková and Siniaková in the final. The pair matched this success at their next event by winning the Miami Open to complete the Sunshine Double. They defeated three of the top six seeds, including third seeds Hsieh Su-wei and Barbora Strýcová in the second round. They won the final against sixth seeds Samantha Stosur and Zhang Shuai. With these two titles, Sabalenka rose to No. 21 in the world.

Sabalenka and Mertens continued to partner together throughout the year, entering eleven events before the year-end championships. Whereas Sabalenka did not have much success in the Grand Slam singles events, she produced much better results in doubles. Sabalenka and Mertens reached the semifinals at the French Open, losing to second seeds Babos and Mladenovic. They then reached the quarterfinals at Wimbledon, losing to third seeds Hsieh and Strýcová. These were Sabalenka's first two appearances in at least the quarterfinals at a Grand Slam event. Sabalenka and Mertens had their best result of the year at the US Open. As the fourth seeds at the event, they made it to the final without having to play another top ten seeded team. In the final, they faced eighth seeds Victoria Azarenka and Ashleigh Barty, the latter of whom had won the title a year earlier with CoCo Vandeweghe. Sabalenka and Mertens defeated Azarenka and Barty in straight sets for their first career Grand Slam title in any discipline. With this title, Sabalenka made her top 10 debut in doubles at No. 6 in the world.

Sabalenka and Mertens made one more final during the year, finishing runner-up at the Wuhan Open where Sabalenka won the singles title. Their three big titles helped them win the Race to Shenzhen and qualify for the WTA Finals as the top seeds. Before the event, Sabalenka and Mertens moved up to No. 2 and No. 3 in the rankings, respectively, behind only world No. 1, Barbora Strýcová. At the WTA Finals, the pair were placed in a round robin group with third seeds Babos and Mladenovic, fifth seeds Chan Hao-ching and Latisha Chan, as well as eighth seeds Anna-Lena Grönefeld and Demi Schuurs. In their opening match, they were upset by Grönefeld and Schuurs in a match tiebreak. After defeating the Chan sisters, Sabalenka and Mertens lost to Babos and Mladenovic in another match tiebreak and did not advance out of their group.

2020: Three WTA titles, year-end top 10
Sabalenka continued on from her late season surge by reaching the semifinals in Adelaide. She came from a 3–5 final set deficit against Hsieh Su-wei before sliding past Bernarda Pera and shocking second seed Simona Halep, whom she had never won a set against before, in straight sets. She then lost in straight sets to eventual runner-up Dayana Yastremska. Despite her good start to the season, she was upset by Carla Suárez Navarro in two tie-breakers in the first round of the Australian Open. In doubles she enjoyed moderate success with Mertens reaching the quarterfinals, before losing to the Chan sisters. Her next tournament was the Dubai Tennis Championships where she made the quarterfinals with wins over Maria Sakkari and doubles partner Mertens. There she faced Simona Halep. Despite taking the first set she was unable to repeat her earlier upset falling to the eventual champion in three sets. She rebounded at the Qatar Open, reaching the final with wins over Anett Kontaveit, Maria Sakkari, Zheng Saisai and Svetlana Kuznetsova. In the final, she defeated Petra Kvitová in straight sets to claim her third Premier-5 title. After tennis resumed in August due to COVID-19, she was the second seed in Lexington where she survived Madison Brengle in three sets but then fell in a three set thriller to 16 year old Coco Gauff. Her results continued to disappoint as, seeded fifth, she crashed out in the second round of both Cincinnati and New York to Jessica Pegula and a resurgent Victoria Azarenka. She had moderate success in doubles reaching the quarterfinals of both events. Her results in singles began to improve on clay as she reached the semifinals in Strasbourg and the third round of the French Open losing to Elina Svitolina and Ons Jabeur, respectively. That was Sabalenka's last loss of the season. In Ostrava, she came from 5–2 in the decider down to avenge her Lexington loss to Gauff and lost the first ten games of her quarterfinal match against Sara Sorribes Tormo before winning the next twelve to win. In the final, she avenged her US Open loss to Azarenka, defeating her compatriot in straight sets. She then also took the Linz title by defeating Elise Mertens in the final. This gave Sabalenka the first year-end top-10 finish in her career.

2021: World No. 1 in doubles, two major semifinals, world No. 2 in singles
Sabalenka entered 2021 on a nine-match winning streak, and participated in her first tournament of the year at the Abu Dhabi Open as the fourth seed. She defeated Polona Hercog in straight sets, coming back from a 5–2 deficit in the first set, and then defeated Ajla Tomljanović and Ons Jabeur to reach the quarterfinals, similarly in straight sets. She defeated Elena Rybakina in the quarterfinals, where she dropped her first set of the week, before defeating Maria Sakkari, in straight sets. In the final, Sabalenka defeated first-time finalist Veronika Kudermetova, in straight sets, losing just four games in total. The run to the title at Abu Dhabi extended her winning streak to 15 matches, and catapulted her to a new ranking of No. 7.

Sabalenka went into the Australian Open looking to make a Grand Slam singles quarterfinal for the first time in her career. She was defeated in the fourth round by 23-time Grand Slam champion Serena Williams in three sets. Sabalenka won the doubles competition with Elise Mertens. By virtue of winning the title, Sabalenka ascended to world No. 1 in the doubles rankings for the first time in her career, on 22 February 2021.

As defending champion at the Qatar Open in Doha, and after receiving a first-round bye, Sabalenka was defeated in her first match by eventual finalist Garbiñe Muguruza, in three sets. At the Dubai Tennis Championships, in her first tournament since becoming No. 1 in doubles, Sabalenka and Mertens received a bye in the first round and lost their opening match to Jessica Pegula and Bethanie Mattek-Sands. Sabalenka cruised through to the quarterfinals in the singles event, defeating 15th seed Anett Kontaveit along the way, before losing to Muguruza for the second time in as many weeks, again in three sets.

Sabalenka won the title at the Madrid Open where she faced Ashleigh Barty in the championship match. It was a rematch of the 2021 Porsche Tennis Grand Prix final, two week earlier, as Sabalenka faced her vanquisher, world No. 1 Ashleigh Barty. As a result of her fourth WTA 1000 title, she entered the top 5 rankings in singles at world No. 4.

Sabalenka and compatriot Victoria Azarenka won the doubles event at the German Open, defeating the top seeded pair of Demi Schuurs and Nicole Melichar.

Seeded second at Wimbledon, Sabalenka reached her first Grand Slam quarterfinal and semifinal, defeating 18th seed Elena Rybakina and 21st seed Ons Jabeur in straight sets, respectively. She then lost her semifinal match against Karolina Pliskova in three sets. As a result of her performance at Wimbledon she reached a career-high ranking of world No. 3 in the WTA singles rankings. Sabalenka became the third Belarusian woman to reach the last four of Wimbledon following Natasha Zvereva in 1998 and Victoria Azarenka in 2011 and 2012.

Sabalenka continued her season at the Canadian Open in Montreal. She reached the semifinals but lost to Karolína Plíšková, in straight sets. She then lost her opening-round match against Paula Badosa at the Cincinnati Open. Despite the loss, Sabalenka reached a career-high ranking of world No. 2.

At the US Open, Sabalenka reached her second consecutive (and second overall) major semifinal following wins over Danielle Collins, Elise Mertens, and Barbora Krejčíková. In the semifinal, she lost to Leylah Fernandez in three sets.

Due to a positive COVID-19 test, Sabalenka was not able to play at Indian Wells.

2022: WTA Finals runner-up, second US Open semifinal
Sabalenka began season at the 2022 Adelaide International 1 as the second seed. After a first-round bye Sabalenka lost in the second round in straight sets to Kaja Juvan. Sabalenka served 18 double faults to five aces. Next, Sabalenaka received a wildcard to enter the Adelaide International 2 and was seeded top, but lost her first round to a qualifier, world No. 93 Rebecca Peterson, in three sets. Once again Sabalenka struggled with her serve, recording 21 double faults for the match.

She entered the Australian Open as the second seed. 
Sabalenka's serving struggles continued, but she managed to dig out three-set wins against world No. 128 Storm Sanders, No. 100 Wang Xinyu and No. 41 Markéta Vondroušová to advance to the fourth round for the second time in her career. She faced off against giant-killer Kaia Kanepi, who had defeated the 16th seed Angelique Kerber in the first round. Kanepi prevailed in a tight three-set match, which ended in a third set super-tiebreak. Sabalenka managed to save four match points during the match, but also served 15 double faults to Kanepi's four.

She found some form reaching quarterfinals at the Qatar Open beating Alizé Cornet and Jil Teichmann, before losing to the eventual champion Iga Świątek in the semifinals. Following early exits in Indian Wells, Miami and Charleston, she reached her first final of 2022 at the Women’s Stuttgart Open, defeating Bianca Andreescu, world No. 6 Anett Kontaveit and Paula Badosa, the new world No. 2, eventually losing to world No. 1, Świątek, again. Entering as the defending champion at the Madrid Open, Sabalenka was knocked out by Amanda Anisimova in the first round. At the Italian Open, after defeating Zhang Shuai, Amanda Anisimova, and Jessica Pegula, she lost to Świątek in the semifinals for the third time in 2022. At the French Open, Sabalenka lost in the third round to Camila Giorgi, in three sets.

Sabalenka began the grass-court season at the Libéma Open as the top seed, where she made the final, losing to Ekaterina Alexandrova. She then entered the German Open as the third seed, but lost in the first round to Veronika Kudermetova. Due to Wimbledon's ruling on Russian and Belarusian players, Sabalenka was banned from participating in the event due to the ongoing crisis in Ukraine, cutting her grass season short.

She opened the US hardcourt swing in Silicon Valley Classic, losing to Daria Kasatkina in the quarterfinals. She then played the Canadian Open, losing to Coco Gauff in the third round. Her best result since Stuttgart came at Cincinnati Open, where as the sixth seed, she made the semifinals, defeating Anna Kalinskaya, Shelby Rogers, and Zhang Shuai before losing to eventual champion Caroline Garcia in three sets. She then made her best run of the season at the US Open. Seeded sixth, she defeated Catherine Harrison, Kaia Kanepi, Clara Burel, 19th seed Danielle Collins,and 22nd seed & former world No. 1 Karolína Plíšková to reach the semifinals, matching her previous best result from 2021. In her second round match against Kanepi, Sabalenka came back from 6–2, 5–1 down to win in three sets, saving two match points in the process. In the semifinals, she was defeated by world No. 1 Iga Świątek for the fourth time this season.

At the San Diego Open, Sabalenka defeated Sloane Stephens in three sets before losing to Donna Vekić in the quarterfinals. In receipt of a first-round bye in Guadalajara, she lost to Liudmila Samsonova in the second round. However, she managed to qualify for the WTA Finals for a second straight year. There, she reached the final, defeating world No. 3 Jessica Pegula and No. 2 Ons Jabeur in the round robin stage, and No. 1 Iga Swiatek in the semifinals, but lost to Caroline Garcia in straight sets. She became the fourth woman to defeat the top 3 players at the same tournament joining Steffi Graf (1999 Roland Garros), Serena Williams (2002 Miami Open), and Venus Williams (2008 WTA Finals).

2023: First title since 2021, Australian Open champion 
Sabalenka entered Adelaide 1 as second seed. She reached her first final of the season by defeating Liudmila Samsonova, Markéta Vondroušová, Irina-Camelia Begu en route. Then, she defeated Czech teenage qualifier Linda Nosková to win her first title since Madrid 2021 and 11th WTA career title without dropping a set all week.

Sabalenka entered the Australian Open as 5th seed and one of the title contenders. She defeated Tereza Martincová, Shelby Rogers, former doubles partner and 26th seed Elise Mertens, and the previous week's Adelaide 2 Champion No. 10 Belinda Bencic to reach her first-ever Australian Open quarterfinal. She then beat Donna Vekić to reached her fourth grand slam semifinal. She won her 10th consecutive match by beating Magda Linette in the semifinals to make her first ever major final. In the final, she defeated reigning Wimbledon champion Elena Rybakina in three sets to win her first Grand Slam title. She became the third Belarusian to ever win a Grand Slam singles title, and the first since Victoria Azarenka, a decade ago.

In Dubai, Sabalenka  defeated Lauren Davis and Jelena Ostapenko to reach the quarterfinals, where she fell to the eventual champion Barbora Krejciková in three sets. She then participated in Indian Wells, where she defeated Evgeniya Rodina and took revenge from Barbora Krejčíková  for her last defeat in three sets. Then she defeated Coco Gauff and Maria Sakkari to reach her first Indian Wells final, where she lost to Elena Rybakina in a rematch of the 2023 Australian Open final.

National representation

Fed Cup

Early appearances
Sabalenka represented Belarus at the Junior Fed Cup in 2014, with the team finishing in sixth place. She then made her senior Fed Cup debut for Belarus in April 2016, losing a dead rubber doubles match against Russia. Nonetheless, the Belarusian team led by Victoria Azarenka and Aliaksandra Sasnovich won the tie to qualify for the top-tier World Group the following season for the first time in their history.

2017: Surprise runner-up in World Group debut
The Belarus Fed Cup team made their debut in the World Group and ultimately reached the final, despite being the underdogs in all three ties. Little was expected from the team because they were without their veteran leader Azarenka, who missed the first two ties on maternity leave and the last because of a custody battle. Without her, Belarus was led by Sabalenka and Sasnovich, neither of whom had ever been ranked above No. 76 by the time of the final. However, they did have the advantage of playing all of their ties at home in Minsk.

The ties in the quarterfinals against the Netherlands in February and the semi-finals against Switzerland in April both played out in the same way. While Sabalenka lost her opening matches to their opponents' respective top-ranked players of Kiki Bertens and Timea Bacsinszky, Sasnovich was able to give Belarus a 2–1 lead in each instance. Sabalenka then clinched both ties, with wins over Michaëlla Krajicek and No. 54 Viktorija Golubic, respectively. She was only ranked No. 125 at the time of the semifinal, with no career tour match wins outside of Fed Cup.

On the opening day of the final against the United States, Sabalenka upset the reigning US Open champion and world No. 13, Sloane Stephens, to level the tie after Sasnovich lost her first rubber to No. 10, CoCo Vandeweghe. The next day began with Sabalenka losing to Vandeweghe, before Sasnovich again levelled the tie by defeating Stephens. Sabalenka and Sasnovich were then selected for the decisive doubles rubber for the Fed Cup crown, but the duo were comprehensively defeated by Vandeweghe and Shelby Rogers.

Despite finishing as runner-up, Belarus's Fed Cup success helped popularize women's tennis in Belarus, and vaulted Sabalenka and Sasnovich into international prominence. Sasnovich said, "When we played the quarterfinals and semi-finals in Minsk, a lot of people were coming to see our matches. They finally saw tennis in life, and it’s like a popularization... I want my country to improve even more in tennis, because I think we can have even more from Belarus."

2018–19: Avoiding demotion, another semifinal
Belarus was unable to repeat their 2017 Fed Cup success in 2018. Their quarterfinal tie was held in Minsk against Germany. Although Sabalenka won both of her singles rubbers, Sasnovich and Vera Lapko lost each of theirs to set up a decisive doubles rubber. Sabalenka and doubles specialist Lidziya Marozava were selected for the match, with Sabalenka playing on short rest directly after her last singles match. After taking the first set against Anna-Lena Grönefeld and Tatjana Maria, they ultimately lost the rubber and the tie.

Their next tie was again contested in Minsk as part of the World Group Play-offs, with Slovakia competing to take Belarus's place in the World Group the following season. Sabalenka and Sasnovich each split their two singles rubbers, with Sabalenka being upset by Viktória Kužmová. Doubles specialists Lapko and Marozava were chosen for the final rubber and the pair won the match to keep Belarus in the World Group for 2019.

In the 2019 Fed Cup, Belarus were drawn against Germany in the quarterfinals for the second consecutive year. After Sasnovich won the opening rubber against Maria, Sabalenka won both of her singles rubbers against Andrea Petkovic and Laura Siegemund to clinch the tie. They advanced to face Australia in the semi-finals. Only two players from each team participated: Sabalenka and Azarenka for Belarus, and Ashleigh Barty and Samantha Stosur for Australia. Both Sabalenka and Azarenka defeated Stosur, but lost to Barty. In the decisive doubles rubber, Barty and Stosur won in three sets to eliminate Belarus.

Playing style

Sabalenka is a baseliner. She has a powerful serve, and equally powerful groundstrokes, and her game is based around hitting groundstroke winners. She has said "I hope all my shots can be strong, but my serve, I feel is the best." Sabalenka's strong serve, which can reach 194 km/h (124 mph), allows her to serve a large number of aces; in 2020, she ranked third of all players in terms of aces served, at 165. Her serve is inconsistent, however, leading to a high double fault count; she served 166 double faults in 2020, the most of any player. Sabalenka notably suffered from the yips from the 2021 WTA Finals and into 2022, serving 152 double faults in 11 matches, an average of 14 double faults a match. Her second serve began to show improvements from March 2022, following training with Mark Philippoussis, with Sabalenka serving no double faults in her match against Jil Teichmann at Doha; this was her first match where she served no double faults since 2018. Overall, Sabalenka served 440 double faults in 2022. Her groundstrokes are often hit very flat, and are hit with relentless pace and depth. Tennis broadcaster and former professional player Mary Carillo praised the power in her style of play along with her fierce attitude, describing her game as "big babe tennis personified". Although Sabalenka has the ability to hit a lot of winners, they are often accompanied by a lot of unforced errors. In her first career top ten victory against Karolína Plíšková, she hit 40 winners and 39 unforced errors. Her second career top ten victory against Caroline Wozniacki was similar, featuring 64 winners and 54 unforced errors. Her coach Dmitry Tursunov credited her improvement in the summer of 2018 on developing better shot selection. He said, "The major thing is she stopped trying [to] hit a winner with every shot."

Sabalenka prefers playing on grass and hard courts. She commented, "This year [in 2017] I played for the first time on grass courts [during Wimbledon]. And I really liked it. I enjoyed my game on the grass courts, the feeling of grass, that's nice. I think my game is suited for grass and for hard courts." On clay, she made both the singles and doubles finals at the 2018 Ladies Open Lugano. She won her first clay court title at the 2021 Madrid Open.

Sabalenka frequently accompanies her shots with loud grunting. She said, "Honestly, I don’t even hear myself when I am playing." However, she expressed her hopes that her grunting has no disturbance on her opponents. At the Australian Open in 2018, the home crowd mocked her habit in a match against Australian Ashleigh Barty.

Coaches
Sabalenka had worked with Khalil Ibrahimov for two years up until early 2018. At this point, she began working with former Swedish professional tennis players Magnus Norman and Magnus Tideman. Dmitry Tursunov became her primary coach in time for the grass court season in 2018. Sabalenka briefly split with Tursunov after the 2019 US Open. Although they reunited later in the year, she made the split permanent at the end of the season. Sabalenka briefly worked with Dieter Kindlmann before switching coaches to her longtime hitting partner and compatriot Anton Dubrov.

Sponsorships
Sabalenka has been endorsed by Nike for apparel and shoes since the start of her professional career. She is also endorsed by Wilson, specifically using the Wilson Blade range of racquets.

Personal life
Sabalenka has a tiger tattoo on her left arm. This tattoo has earned her the nickname "The Tiger", which she has used to refer to herself. Sabalenka has studied at the Belarusian State University in a sports-related program. Her tennis idols growing up were Serena Williams and Maria Sharapova.

Political views
During the 2020–2021 Belarusian protests, Sabalenka avoided publicly criticizing Belarusian president Alexander Lukashenko and his government. At the same time, she praised Lukashenko's government for "all [the good] that is done for the country in general and for sports in particular". In 2020, Sabalenka signed an open letter which stated that sport should remain outside of politics, and was considered to be a pro-government response to the activities of the Free Association of Athletes of Belarus which demanded new elections.

After Wimbledon banned players from Belarus and Russia from competing in 2022 following the start of the Russian invasion of Ukraine, Sabalenka stated: "I just understand that it's not my fault".

Career statistics

Grand Slam tournament performance timelines

Singles

Doubles

Grand Slam tournament finals

Singles: 1 (1 title)

Doubles: 2 (2 titles)

Year-end championships finals

Singles: 1 (1 runner-up)

References

External links

 Official website 
 
 
 
 
 
 

1998 births
Australian Open (tennis) champions
Living people
Belarusian female tennis players
Tennis players from Minsk
Grand Slam (tennis) champions in women's singles
Grand Slam (tennis) champions in women's doubles
Olympic tennis players of Belarus
US Open (tennis) champions
Tennis players at the 2020 Summer Olympics
WTA number 1 ranked doubles tennis players